"Ever Fallen in Love (With Someone You Shouldn't've)" is a 1978 song written by Pete Shelley and performed by his group Buzzcocks. It was a number 12 hit on the UK Singles Chart and was included on the album Love Bites.

Background and writing
In November 1977, the Buzzcocks were on a headline tour of the UK. Before a gig at the Clouds (also known as the Cavendish Ballroom) in Edinburgh, they stayed the night. Pete Shelley later recalled:

"We were in the Blenheim Guest House with pints of beer, sitting in the TV room half-watching Guys and Dolls. One of the characters, Adelaide, is saying to Marlon Brando's character, 'Wait till you fall in love with someone you shouldn't have.' "I thought, 'fallen in love with someone you shouldn't have?' Hmm, that's good."

The following day Shelley wrote the lyrics of the song, in a van outside the main post office on nearby Waterloo Place. The music followed soon after. In an interview, Shelley said that the song was about a man named Francis Cookson that he lived with for about seven years.

Music and lyrics
The music and lyrics, as well as the singing, belong to Shelley. The song uses the verse-chorus formal pattern and is in the key of E major. Both the verse and the chorus start with C# minor chords (sixth degree in E major, and relative minor key of E major), which "give [the song] a distinctly downbeat, edgy feel." The minor chords and the B-major-to-D-major move in the chorus are unusual for a 1970s punk song, yet they contribute to its ear-catching nature, along with the vocal melody. The verses feature a guitar riff and a double stroke tom-tom drum pattern over the E chord. The vocal melody ranges from G#3 to baritone F#4 in the verses and chorus; in the ending, Shelley hits a tenor G4 and then a G#4.

The lyrics consist of two verses (of which one is repeated) and a chorus. According to music critic Mark Deming, "the lyrics owe less to adolescent self-pity than the more adult realization of how much being in love can hurt – and how little one can really do about it."

Pitchfork's Jason Heller described the music by writing, "Guitars seethe and beats clench. Shelley sings like a man whose entire existence hangs by a single frayed nerve."

Critical reception
The song was ranked at No. 1 among "Tracks of the Year" for 1978 by NME. Critic Ned Raggett describes the song as a "deservedly well-known masterpiece." Mark Deming notes, "Pete Shelley's basic formula in the Buzzcocks was to marry the speed and emotional urgency of punk with the hooky melodies and boy/girl thematics of classic pop/rock. When he applied this thinking to that most classic of pop themes, unrequited teenage love, he crafted one of his most indelible songs, 'Ever Fallen in Love?'" In 2021, it was ranked at No. 276 on Rolling Stone's "Top 500 Best Songs of All Time".

Writing for Pitchfork, Jason Heller called the song "the peak...of the Buzzcocks' legacy", and said that "It’s a tribute not only to the notion that punk can be a thoughtful expression of naked feeling, but to Buzzcocks’ idiosyncratic embrace of the finer points of classic pop songcraft."

Cover versions
UK band Fine Young Cannibals had a No. 9 UK hit with their cover version, recorded for the soundtrack of the 1986 film Something Wild, which was later included on the band's album The Raw & the Cooked.
In 2011, a cover was made by the New Zealand soap opera Shortland Street for their winter season, with a jazzy feel, sung by Amanda Billing, who plays Sarah Potts. It fitted with the storyline of her character being pregnant with her ex-husband TK Samuels's child and him having moved on with his fiancée. Her version reached no. 24 in New Zealand.
A cover of the song was released as a charity tribute single to DJ John Peel on 21 November 2005. It featured artists including Roger Daltrey (The Who), The Datsuns, The Futureheads, David Gilmour (Pink Floyd), Peter Hook (New Order), Elton John, El Presidente, Robert Plant (Led Zeppelin), Pete Shelley and the Soledad Brothers. The single was supported by Peel's son, Tom Ravenscroft, and proceeds went to Amnesty International.
American post-hardcore band Thursday covered the song in 2005, for the soundtrack of the video game Tony Hawk's American Wasteland.
A cover by Pete Yorn appeared on the Shrek 2 soundtrack in 2004.
Canadian punk rock band Pup performed a version of the song in July 2014 for The A.V. Club A.V. Undercover series.
French band Nouvelle Vague made a cover of the song for their 2006 album Bande à Part.

Charts

Buzzcocks version

Fine Young Cannibals version

1Remix

Amanda Billing version

Certifications

References

External links
Buzzcocks' Official Website

1978 songs
1978 singles
1986 singles
2005 singles
2011 singles
2012 singles
Buzzcocks songs
Charity singles
Fine Young Cannibals songs
LGBT-related songs
Number-one singles in South Africa
Song recordings produced by Martin Rushent
Songs written by Pete Shelley
United Artists Records singles